is a train station located in Sawara-ku, Fukuoka in Japan. Its station symbol is a wisteria flower  in violet.

Lines

Platforms

Vicinity
Sawara Ward Office
Sawara Civic Center
Fukuoka City Education Center
Sawara Public Health Center
Sawara Post Office
Sawara Library
Sawara Police
several Elementary and Junior High Schools
Forest Management Office
Fujisaki Bus Terminal

References

Railway stations in Japan opened in 1981
Kūkō Line (Fukuoka City Subway)
Railway stations in Fukuoka Prefecture